Tiddles was a famously fat cat.

Tiddles may also refer to:
List of Are You Being Served? characters#Tiddles and Winston, Mrs Slocombe's cat on Are You Being Served?
Ship's cat#Tiddles, a Royal Navy ship's cat
Tiddles the Tiger snake, a character in the Australian children's television cartoon series  Kangaroo Creek Gang 
Tiddles, a 1970 play by Henry Livings
Tiddles, a genus of marine flatworms in the infraorder Maricola 
A cultivar of Delphinium